The Montgomery County Toll Road Authority (MCTRA), formerly the Montgomery County Transportation Program (MCTP), is a government agency created on August 24, 2006 by Montgomery County to oversee all future toll road projects within the county. MCTRA operates one toll road: the MCTRA 249 Tollway, which serves as the tolled mainlines of SH 249 (Tomball Parkway). This toll projects are located inside of Montgomery County, in the U.S. state of Texas.

History
In 2005, Montgomery County created the Montgomery County Transportation Program (MCTP) to oversee various pass through toll, called a shadow toll in other countries, financing projects for the state of Texas, located within Montgomery County.

On August 24, 2006, Montgomery County created the Montgomery County Toll Road Authority (MCTRA) to oversee all future toll road projects, located within Montgomery County.

When the MCTRA began collecting tolls from the tolling facilities, it used the EZ TAG system along with the two Texas interoperable tags used in the state;  Texas Department of Transportation's TxTag and the North Texas Tollway Authority's TollTag as well as any other state tags that Texas becomes interoperable with.

Roadway system

Roads built by the MCTP

Roads operated by the MCTRA

See also

Notes

References

External links
 Montgomery County creates toll road authority
 Pass-Through Financing Program

Transportation in Houston
Transportation in Montgomery County, Texas
Toll roads in Texas
Toll road authorities of the United States